Albert Edgar Summers, from Kanawha County, was the Democratic Speaker of the West Virginia House of Delegates in 1872 and Democratic President of the West Virginia Senate from 1881 to 1883.

References

Democratic Party West Virginia state senators
Presidents of the West Virginia State Senate
Speakers of the West Virginia House of Delegates
Democratic Party members of the West Virginia House of Delegates
People from Kanawha County, West Virginia
1824 births
1901 deaths
19th-century American politicians